Ariel is a science fiction novel by Alexander Beliaev published for the first time in 1941.

The main character, Ariel, has the power to fly without any device as a result of a scientific experiment aimed at creation of this ability. He and a young friend escape from the school where they were confined. In the course of the events, Ariel discovers that he is English and was taken to that special school in India because he and his sister were rich, and that he was given into custody to people who want his money.

The novel was made into a film in 1992, directed by Yevgeni Kotov.

References

External links
 

1941 science fiction novels
Russian novels adapted into films
Novels by Alexander Beliaev
Soviet science fiction novels
Superhero novels
20th-century Russian novels